Kengtung (Chiang Tung), known as Menggen Prefecture or Möng Khün Chiefdom or Mueng Khuen Fu from 1405 to 1895, was a Shan state in what is today Burma. The capital and the residence of the ruler was Kengtung (then known as "Tai Khuen City" 歹掯城) in the centre of the state. It was the only urban area in this mountainous state whose landscape is dominated by the Daen Lao Range.

Kengtung was the largest of the states in present-day Shan State and ranked first in the order of precedence at the time of the invasion of the Shan States by the British Empire. It was also the easternmost of the Southern Shan States, lying almost entirely east of the Salween and stretching eastwards to the Mekong. It was separated from the northern Shan state of Manglon by the Hka River.

Most of the early history of Kengtung is made up of myths and legends. At the time of British rule in Burma the Tai Yai people were the majority of the population in Kengtung state with other groups such as Akha and Lahu, forming sizeable communities. According to Wa tradition, in the distant past the territory had belonged to the Wa people who were displaced around 1229 and were later defeated by King Mangrai. The Wa now form a minority of only about 10% in Kengtung State despite having been —according to their myths— the original inhabitants.

History

Early kingdoms
According to local tradition, Khemāraṭṭha, the predecessor state, was founded in an unknown date in the distant past. It was ruled by the Tai Khün of the Tai Yai (Shan) ethnic background. The current dynasty has its origins in the kingdom that was founded around 1243 by a prince named Mang Kun, said to be a delegate of King Mangrai.
Despite the ethnic affinity of the ruling Tai with the Siamese to the south, Kengtung was led by Saopha princes who historically preferred to pay tribute to the Burmese kings to the west. The King of Mandalay restricted himself to exacting a yearly tribute, often in the form of offerings of ritual gold flowers, leaving the Kengtung rulers largely alone. The Salween river also acted as a protective natural border in the West hampering communication with Upper Burma. On the other hand, the kingdoms of Lanna and Ayutthaya, as well as the Chinese to the northeast, were closer, more bellicose and had easier access to the territory.

Modern history

In 1760, following conflicting claims of political influence over Kengtung State, there was a war between the Qianlong Emperor of the Qing Dynasty and the King of Burma, Hsinbyushin.
In 1802 Kengtung came under the rule of Chiang Mai, but with the help of the Burmese the former ruling dynasty was reinstated in 1814 and Mongyawng (Möngyawng) state was annexed.

Kengtung was historically located at the crossroads of the trade between China and Siam and 19th century sources talk about caravans crossing Kengtung on their way to Chiang Mai totaling yearly 8,000 mules loaded with goods from China.
During British rule in Burma the eastern border was demarcated by the colonial powers and the western part of Kengcheng was merged with Kengtung. Historically Kengtung also included the substates of Hsenyawt, Hsenmawng, Monghsat and Mongpu.

On 27 May 1942, during World War II, Kengtung State was invaded and its capital captured by the Thai Phayap Army. Following a previous agreement between Thai Prime Minister Plaek Phibunsongkhram and the Japanese Empire, in December the same year the Thai administration occupied Kengtung and four districts of Möngpan. The annexation of the trans-Salween territories historically claimed by Thailand was formalised on 1 August 1943 and the northern province of Saharat Thai Doem was established. Thailand left the territory in 1945, but officially relinquished its claim over Kengtung State only in 1946 as part of the condition for admission to the United Nations and the withdrawal of all wartime sanctions for having sided with the Axis powers.

The last ruler of Kengtung abdicated in 1959. The state became then part of Shan State and, despite the independence struggle of the latter, eventually part of Burma. After the 1962 military coup by General Ne Win all the privileges of the saophas were abolished.

Rulers
The rulers of Kengtung bore the title of Saopha; their ritual style was Khemadhipati Rajadhiraja.

The Kengtung Yazawin, also known as 'Padaeng Chronicle' and 'Jengtung State Chronicle', is a history of the rulers of Kengtung written in the 19th century in Burmese language. It was translated into English by Sao Saimong Mangrai.

Saophas 
Chinese records
Mang Kun and Mang Kyin were Yonnaka governors sent by Mang Lai. Marquess of Kengtung refers to a son of Mang Lai.

Burmese records
1243–1247: Man Kun  (1st Saopha) (?–1247)
?–?: Sao Awk  (28th Saopha)
?–1730: Sao Möng Lek (1646–1730)
1730–c.1735: Sao Maung Hkawn (1st time) (1706–17??)
c.1735–1739: (vancant)
1739–1742: Sao Maung Hkawn (2nd time) (s.a.)
1742–1786: Sao Möng Hsam (1744–1786)
1787–1802: Sao Kawng Tai I (1st time) (1769–1813)
1814–1815: Sao Kawng Tai I (2nd time) (s.a.)
1815–1857: Sao Maha Hkanan (1781–1857)
1857–1876: Sao Maha Pawn (1814–1876)
1877–1881: Sao Hseng (1818–1881)
1881–1885: Sao Kawng Tai II (1829–1885)
1886–1895: Sao Kawn Kham Hpu (1874–1895)
 7 May 1895 – 21 July 1935  Sao Kawng Kiao Intaleng: (b. 1874–1935) (administrator to 9 Feb 1897)
21 July 1935 – August 1935: Sao Kaung Tai (1899–1935)
1935–1942: British administration
1942–1945: annexed by Thailand
1945–1962: Sao Sai Long (1927–1997)

Thai Military governor 
Following the Thai occupation, a military governor was appointed for the administration of the annexed territories of Kengtung and Möngpan by Thailand.
December 1942 – 1945: Phin Choonhavan (1891–1973)

See also

 Kengtung Yazawin
 Mi Mi Khaing
 Sao Kawng Kiao Intaleng
 Sao Saimong

References

Bibliography 
 G. J. Younghusband, The Trans-Salween Shan State of Kiang Tung,

External links

"Gazetteer of Upper Burma and the Shan states"
The Imperial Gazetteer of India

 
Military history of Burma during World War II
Military history of Thailand during World War II